Henry Mansfield Cannon Memorial Chapel, also known as Cannon Chapel, is an American historic chapel located on the University of Richmond campus in Richmond, Virginia.  It was designed by architect Charles M. Robinson and built in 1929 in the Late Gothic Revival style. It is constructed of brick, stone, and concrete and has a rectangular plan with a telescoping projection at the rear.  During the mid-1980s, new stained glass windows were
installed as part of a renovation project.

It was listed on the National Register of Historic Places in 2013.

Gallery

The Chapel houses "The Stained Glass Windows of Cannon Memorial Chapel," of which there are 22 in all.  They were designed by Brenda Belfield of Alexandria, VA.  The theme of the windows is "Let All the Universe Praise Thee, O God."  A variety of academic and religious symbols created a unique expression of praise through the beauty of the stained glass and the light shining through them.  The names of the windows are as follows.
1. Rose Window
2. Praise Window
3. Law and Justice Window
4. Commerce and Industry Window
5. Creation Window
6. Prophets Window
7. Incarnation Window
8. Redemption Window
9. Patriots Window
10. Service to the Church Window
11. Resurrection Window
12. Pentecost Window
13. Hope and Renewal Window
14. University Window
15. Arts and Humanities Window
16. Sciences Window
17. Prayer Window
18. Prayer Room Windows
19. Guild Room Windows
20. Bride's Room Windows
21. Groom's Room Windows
22. Groom's Room Foyer Window

References

University of Richmond
University and college buildings on the National Register of Historic Places in Virginia
Properties of religious function on the National Register of Historic Places in Virginia
Gothic Revival church buildings in Virginia
Churches completed in 1929
Churches in Richmond, Virginia
National Register of Historic Places in Richmond, Virginia
Chapels in Richmond, Virginia